Henry Baldwin Harshaw (June 14, 1842December 25, 1900) was an American lawyer and Republican politician.  He was the 10th State Treasurer of Wisconsin.  He served in the famed Iron Brigade of the Army of the Potomac during the American Civil War and lost his left arm at the Battle of Chaffin's Farm.  He is the namesake of Harshaw, Wisconsin.

Biography
Harshaw was born Henry Baldwin Harshaw on June 14, 1842, in Argyle, New York. He moved to Oshkosh, Wisconsin in 1854. Harshaw married Georgia M. Finney in 1864. During the American Civil War, he served with the 2nd Wisconsin Infantry Regiment. While serving, he would be severely wounded and ultimately lose his left arm. Harshaw died of tongue cancer in Milwaukee, Wisconsin on December 25, 1900. The community of Harshaw, Wisconsin, was named in his honor.

Political career
Harshaw was Treasurer from 1887 to 1891. Additionally, he was the postmaster of the Oshkosh post office and a circuit court clerk. He was a Republican.

References

People from Argyle, New York
Politicians from Oshkosh, Wisconsin
State treasurers of Wisconsin
Wisconsin postmasters
Wisconsin Republicans
Union Army soldiers
People of Wisconsin in the American Civil War
Military personnel from Wisconsin
American amputees
1842 births
1900 deaths
Deaths from oral cancer
19th-century American politicians